Hermann Wandinger (24 July 1897 – 26 May 1976) was a German sculptor. His work was part of the sculpture event in the art competition at the 1936 Summer Olympics.

References

1897 births
1976 deaths
20th-century German sculptors
20th-century German male artists
German male sculptors
Olympic competitors in art competitions
People from Erding (district)